Chris Owens may refer to:

Chris Owens (actor) (born 1961), Canadian television actor 
Chris Owens (American football) (born 1986), American football player
Chris Owens (basketball) (born 1979), American basketball player
Chris Owens (burlesque performer), American burlesque performer in New Orleans
Chris Owens, Puerto Rico-born American political activist in New York, son of U.S. Congressman Major Owens
Christopher Owens (born 1979), guitarist, singer and songwriter, formerly of the San Francisco band Girls

See also
Chris Owen (disambiguation)